Edward T. Reidy (April 4, 1903 – October 1975) was an American railroad executive; he led the Chicago Great Western Railway between 1957 and its merger with the Chicago and North Western Railway in 1968.  He had worked for the CGW for more than fifty years; previous to his presidency, he had acted as the Great Western's vice president and general manager from 1952, during the tenure of William N. Deramus III.

References

1903 births
1975 deaths
Chicago Great Western Railway presidents
20th-century American railroad executives